The New-York Historical Society is an American history museum and library in New York City, along Central Park West between 76th and 77th Streets, on the Upper West Side of Manhattan. The society was founded in 1804 as New York's first museum. It presents exhibitions, public programs, and research that explore the history of New York and the nation.

The New-York Historical Society Museum & Library has been at its present location since 1908. The granite building was designed by York & Sawyer in a classic Roman Eclectic style. The building is a designated New York City landmark. A renovation, completed in November 2011, made the building more accessible to the public, provided space for an interactive children's museum, and facilitated access to its collections.

Louise Mirrer has been the president of the Historical Society since 2004. She was previously Executive Vice Chancellor for Academic Affairs of the City University of New York. Beginning in 2005, the museum presented a two-year exhibit on Slavery in New York, its largest theme exhibition in 200 years on a topic which it had never addressed before. It included an art exhibit by artists invited to use museum collections in their works.

The Society generally focuses on the developing city center in Manhattan. Another historical society, the Long Island Historical Society (later Brooklyn Historical Society) was founded in Brooklyn in 1863.

The New-York Historical Society holds an extensive collection of historical artifacts, works of American art, and other materials documenting the history of New York and the United States. It presents well-researched exhibitions on a variety of topics and periods in American history, such as George Washington, Alexander Hamilton, Slavery in New York, The Hudson River School, Abraham Lincoln, Ulysses S. Grant, Tiffany designer Clara Driscoll, and the history of the Constitution. The Society also offers an extensive range of curriculum-based school programs and teacher resources, and provides academic fellowships and organizes public programs for adults to foster lifelong learning and a deep appreciation of history.

Collections

The New-York Historical Society's museum is the oldest in New York City and predates the founding of the Metropolitan Museum of Art by nearly 70 years. Its art holdings comprise more than 1.6 million works. Among them are a world-class collection of Hudson River School paintings, including major works by Thomas Cole and Frederic Edwin Church; iconic genre and history paintings, including works by William Sidney Mount and Eastman Johnson; a vast range of American portraits, including paintings by Rembrandt Peale and Gilbert Stuart; all 435 of John James Audubon's extant preparatory watercolors for The Birds of America; and an encyclopedic collection of more than 800 works documenting the full catalog of representational sculpture in America from the colonial period to the present day.

The Historical Society holds an important collection of paintings and drawings by marine artist James Bard. The museum holds much of sculptor Elie Nadelman's legendary American folk art collection, including furniture and household accessories such as lamps, candlesticks, textiles, glass, and ceramic objects, as well as paintings, toys, weather vanes, sculptural woodcarvings, and chalkware. The Historical Society's holdings in artifacts and decorative arts include George Washington's camp bed from Valley Forge, the desk at which Clement Clarke Moore wrote "A Visit from Saint Nicholas", one of the world's largest collections of Tiffany lamps and glasswork, and a collection of more than 550 late 19th-century American board games.

Its research library contains more than three million books, pamphlets, maps, atlases, newspapers, broadsides, music sheets, manuscripts, prints, photographs, and architectural drawings. Among its collections are far-ranging materials relating to the founding and early history of the nation including the first documentary evidence of the phrase "United States of America"; one of the best collections of 18th-century newspapers in the United States; an outstanding collection of materials documenting slavery and Reconstruction; an exceptional collection of Civil War material, including Ulysses S. Grant's terms of surrender for Robert E. Lee; collections relating to trials in the United States prior to 1860; American fiction, poetry, and belles-lettres prior to 1850; a broad range of materials relating to the history of the circus; and American travel accounts from the colonial era to the present day.

The Society operates a website showing many images from its collection. In 2015, it announced the digitization and posting of over a thousand negatives by photographer Robert L. Bracklow from the late 19th and early 20th centuries.

Early history

The Historical Society was founded on November 20, 1804, largely through the efforts of John Pintard. He was for some years secretary of the American Academy of Fine Arts, as well as the founder of New York's first savings bank. He was also among the first to agitate for a free school system. The first meeting comprised 11 of the city's most prominent citizens, including Mayor DeWitt Clinton. At the meeting, a committee was selected to draw up a constitution, and by December 10, the Historical Society was officially organized.

According to the Historical Society's first catalogue, printed in 1813, the museum then held 4,265 books, as well as 234 volumes of United States documents, 119 almanacs, 130 titles of newspapers, 134 maps, and 30 miscellaneous views. It had already collected the start of a manuscript collection, several oil portraits and 38 engraved portraits.

The Historical Society suffered under heavy debt during its early decades. In 1809, it organized a celebration of the 200th anniversary of the arrival of Henry Hudson in New York Harbor. Inspired by the event, the Historical Society petitioned and later obtained an endowment from the New York State Legislature, to be financed by a lottery in 1814. The failure of the lottery resulted in a debt that forced the Society to mortgage some of its books, which were not redeemed until 1823.

The Historical Society and its collections moved frequently during the 19th century. In 1809, the Historical Society and its collections moved to the Government House on Bowling Green.  Constructed as a residence for the President of the United States when New York was the temporary capital, the building had been unoccupied since the government's relocation to Philadelphia in 1790. In 1816, the Historical Society moved to the New York Institution, formerly the city almshouse on City Hall Park. 

In 1857, it moved into the first building constructed specifically for its collections, at the then-fashionable intersection of Second Avenue and 11th Street, where it stayed for the next 50 years. The Historical Society later acquired a collection of Egyptian and Assyrian art, which was eventually transferred to the Brooklyn Museum of Art. In 1936 it acquired the collections of the Naval History Society (1912-1936).

Current building
Construction for its eighth home began September 10, 1902. The central portion of the current building on Central Park West was completed on December 15, 1908, to designs by architects York and Sawyer, who were known for their bank designs.  In 1938 that central block was extended and sympathetically completed by the construction of pavilions on either end, with Walker & Gillette as architects. That extension project stands among the last examples of Beaux-Arts architecture completed in the city and in the entire country. The building was designated a landmark by the New York City Landmarks Preservation Commission in 1966.

Two notable stained glass windows are found in the library on the 2nd floor. The Arrival of Henry Hudson was designed by Mr. Calvert of the Gorham Manufacturing Company. The second is Revocation of the Edict of Nantes, known as the French Huguenot memorial window, in honor of religious refugees to New York. It is inscribed and signed by the artist, Mary Elizabeth Tillinghast.  The window was underwritten by Margaret Olivia Slocum Sage, a philanthropist who was instrumental in commissioning other windows by Tillinghast.

Decline and revival

The Historical Society's collection continued to grow throughout the 20th century, but renewed financial woes in the 1970s and 1980s forced the Historical Society to limit access to its collections to professional researchers. In the 1980s, under the leadership of Herbert S. Winokur, Jr., a private equity financier and Enron board member, the Society was forced to use endowment invasion to pay their annual operating costs and cover their salaries, to the point where by 1988, they had only enough money in their endowment to pay for another 18 months of operating expenses. 

Barbara Knowles Debs from Manhattanville College was named interim director of the Historical Society. In the same year hundreds of paintings, decorative art objects, and other artifacts, which were stored in a Manhattan warehouse, were found to be critically deteriorating. Many of the objects were on long-term loan to the museum.

In 1995, grants from the city and state restored public access under the direction of Betsy Gotbaum. Since the late 1990s, the New-York Historical Society has invested significantly in facility and installation upgrades, and conducted fundraising.  It has increased its operating budget by 160 percent to enhance and expand its public programs, while maintaining a balanced budget from 1998 to the present. Recent renovations to the Historical Society include new galleries and exhibition spaces, the Henry Luce III Center for the Study of American Culture, a state-of-the-art library reading room, and a new facility to house and provide access to the letters and manuscripts of the Gilder Lehrman Institute of American History. In 2005, the Historical Society was among 406 New York City arts and social service institutions to receive part of a $20 million grant from the Carnegie Corporation, which was made possible through a donation by New York City mayor Michael Bloomberg.

The museum has mounted exhibits on national themes through history in New York. For instance, beginning in 2005 with Slavery and the Making of New York, 1600s–1827, it mounted the first exhibition ever in New York City on the major but little-known role of slavery in the city's economy and history. During the colonial years, 41% of households had slaves, and much of the city's economy through the Civil War was related to the South and slavery; half of its exports were related to cotton. Devoting the entire first floor to the exhibit, the museum mounted the largest theme exhibit in its 200-year history. It also addressed the strengths of African Americans who resisted slavery and created their own culture, both in New York and the nation. 

A related part of the exhibit was commissioning 20 new works by invited artists, some of whom used objects from the museum's collections to create new works and installations on this theme.  The second exhibition was New York Divided: Slavery and the Civil War, 1827–1865, (November 17, 2006 to September 3, 2007), which explored the economy before the war and strong business ties to the South, events related to the war such as the New York City Draft Riots, and other aspects.  Southerners visited New York so frequently in the antebellum era that they had favorite hotels.

Under the direction of Louise Mirrer, a three-year, $65 million renovation of the landmark building on Central Park West was completed in 2011 to enhance public access to the institution's resources. On Central Park West, windows were lengthened to form new entrances, with views into the main gallery, and windows were expanded. To establish "a street presence," the society has installed life-size bronze sculptures outside the building—Abraham Lincoln on Central Park West, Frederick Douglass on West 77th Street—national figures with connections to New York.

After reopening, the Historical Society offered a multimedia installation of major themes of American history through stories and figures from New York's past. It also has a new section for an interactive children's history museum.

Branding
The Historical Society uses an archaic spelling of the geographic name of "New York".  Hyphenating the city's old name was common in the 19th century when the institution was founded, and is still used in this context to provide a unique identity.

New-York Historical Society book prizes

The New-York Historical Society gives three books prizes annually.

Presidents

 Louise Mirrer, 2004–present
 Kenneth Terry Jackson, 2001–2004
 Betsy Gotbaum, 1994–2001
 Norman Pearlstine, 1992–1994
 Barbara Knowles Debs, 1989–1992
 Albert L. Key, 1987–1989
 Robert Guestier Goelet, 1971–1987
 Frederick B. Adams, Jr., 1963–1970
 Irving S. Olds, 1962–1963
 Leroy E. Kimball, 1956–1962
 Fenwick Beekman, 1947–1956
 George Albert Zabriskie, 1939–1947
 John Abeel Weekes, 1913–1939
 Samuel Verplanck Hoffman, 1903–1912
 Eugene Augustus Hoffman, 1901–1902
 John Alsop King, 1887–1900
 Benjamin Hazard Field, 1885–1886
 Augustus Schell, 1883–1884
 Frederic DePeyster, 1873–1882
 Augustus Schell, 1872
 Thomas DeWitt, 1869–1871
 Hamilton Fish, 1867–1869
 Frederic DePeyster, 1864–1866
 Luther Bradish, 1850–1863
 Albert Gallatin, 1843–1849
 Peter Augustus Jay, 1840–1842
 Peter Gerard Stuyvesant, 1836–1839
 Morgan Lewis, 1832–1835
 James Kent, 1828–1831
 David Hosack, 1820–1827
 DeWitt Clinton, 1817–19
 Gouverneur Morris, 1816
 Egbert Benson, 1805–1815

See also 
 The Course of Empire
 History of New York (state)
 History of New York City
 List of museums and cultural institutions in New York City
 List of New York City Designated Landmarks in Manhattan from 59th to 110th Streets
 New York State Historical Association

References

Further reading
 Shapiro, Gary. "Celebrations of Learning Knickerbocker", The New York Sun, May 4, 2006
 Regis, Necee. "Don't Expect to Relax on your visit to NYC", The Boston Globe, November 21, 2005
 Fine Art Connoisseur, November/December 2006
 The American Musicals Project, Official website
 Miller, Dan. "Focus on Education: Fifth Graders Visit Slavery Exhibit", The Queens Times, November 24, 2005
 Review of Alexander Hamilton: The Man Who Made Modern America, Teachinghistory.org

External links

 New-York Historical Society website
 New-York Historical Society archival records at the New-York Historical Society Library
 New-York Historical Society at Google Cultural Institute
 The New-York Historical Society Documentary produced by Treasures of New York

 
1804 establishments in New York (state)
Art museums and galleries in New York City
Central Park West Historic District
Historic district contributing properties in Manhattan
Historical societies in New York (state)
Historical societies in New York City
Historical society museums in New York (state)
Historical society museums in New York City
History museums in New York City
Libraries in New York (state)
Museums established in 1804
Museums in Manhattan
New York City Designated Landmarks in Manhattan
State historical societies of the United States
Research libraries in the United States
Upper West Side